Khalajlu (also Romanized as Khalājlū; also known as Khalājū and Khallājlū Daqdū) is a village in Sivkanlu Rural District, in the Central District of Shirvan County, North Khorasan Province, Iran. At the 2006 census, its population was 159, in 34 families.

References 

Populated places in Shirvan County